Jeremy Brooks (17 December 1926 – 27 June 1994) was a novelist, poet, and dramatist. He is best known for his novels (particularly Jampot Smith, Henry's War and Smith, As Hero) and for his stage adaptations of classic works, particularly a series of Maxim Gorky plays for the Royal Shakespeare Company. His novels were praised for their lyricism and for their "Chekhovian mixture of comic concision and pathos". Anthony Burgess, in The Novel Now said "Jeremy Brooks has come to considerable stature in Jampot Smith and Smith, as Hero: he has created one of the few really large picaresque characters in the post-war novel."

Life and work
Jeremy Brooks was born in Southampton in 1926 and went to Brighton Grammar School until, with the onset of World War II, he was evacuated with his family to Llandudno in North Wales, where he attended John Bright school. School was followed immediately by military training and service in the Navy, where he saw the last years of the war from the deck of a minesweeper in the Mediterranean (an experience that provided material for his novel, Smith, As Hero).

After the war Brooks went on a navy scholarship to Oxford, where his English tutor was C. S. Lewis. He then attended Camberwell School of Art, where his wife, the painter Eleanor Brooks (née Nevile), was also a student (although they did not meet at that time). He and Eleanor were married in 1950 and, after a spell on a Houseboat on the Thames, they eventually set up home in a near-derelict and remote cottage in North Wales on the estate of Clough Williams Ellis (the architect and creator of the Portmeirion hotel), where his wife still lives today.

Throughout the fifties, living in near-poverty with three young children, Brooks pursued his writing. Critical success came with his second novel, Jampot Smith (recently republished in the Library of Wales classics series). This led to opportunities for paid work and the family eventually moved to London, with the manuscript of his third novel (Henry’s War, 1962) lying on the back shelf of the car (where a bottle of his wife's ink slowly seeped into it for the duration of the journey, obliterating all but the edges of each page of tissue-thin typing paper – a disaster that Brooks later said had resulted in a better book).

Now settled in London, Brooks wrote his fourth novel (Smith, As Hero, 1964) and worked for New Statesman, The Sunday Times and the Royal Shakespeare Company at the Aldwych, becoming Literary Manager there in 1964. As such, he was closely involved with the important figures of the theatre world throughout much of the sixties and seventies, particularly Peter Hall and Trevor Nunn, but also David Jones, Terry Hands, Adrian Noble, Clifford Williams, David Hare, David Edgar.

This was a period of great upheaval in establishment theatre, with ground-breaking productions coming thick and fast (Peter Brook's Midsummer Night's Dream and Marat-Sade; works by Harold Pinter and Edward Bond; As You Like It with an all-male cast; Tom Stoppard's Rosencrantz and Guildenstern Are Dead) and the politics of the counter culture sometimes interfering with the smooth running of the RSC. For Brooks the writer, this was too much distraction and he left the RSC sometime in the early seventies to concentrate on his own projects (among them an unfinished manuscript that deals in a highly personal and semi-fictionalised way with his time at the RSC). During all this time and on through the eighties, Brooks directed his creative energies largely towards theatre and film projects. He had never made any money from his novels (not even from Smith As Hero which spent time on the best-seller lists) and now with a family of four children, he needed to earn. He wrote screenplays (Our Mother's House; Work is a Four Letter Word); television scripts for directors such as Karel Reisz and Ken Loach and a great number of important and memorable adaptations of classics for the stage (The Lower Depths, The Government Inspector (with Paul Scofield), Enemies (with a young Helen Mirren), The Forest, A Child's Christmas in Wales (co-written with Adrian Mitchell), The Cherry Orchard, Medea, The Wind in the Willows and many more). The majority of these were for the RSC, where he worked closely with the director David Jones, but in later life he formed a fruitful relationship with Theatre Clwyd at Mold. This took him back to North Wales, where he died in 1994.

Throughout his life, Brooks also wrote poetry (as a schoolboy he had won an Eisteddfod poetry competition) and although during the 1950s many of his poems were published in poetry magazines such as Elegebra, he subsequently never sought its publication, poetry being, for him, a very personal and private pursuit. Moreover, only his earlier poetic work survives (collected in a privately published edition, Wales 1950, Rugosa Press, 2008), an unpublished collection of his poems written throughout the 1960s having been stolen and never recovered.

Critical response

Anthony Burgess, in The Novel Now, said "Jeremy Brooks has come to considerable stature in Jampot Smith and Smith, as Hero: he has created one of the few really large picaresque characters in the post-war novel."

Micheal Kustow, in his obituary for The Guardian, said "His fiction aspired to, and often achieved, a Chekhovian mixture of comic concision and pathos. Jampot Smith is a small classic about the delight and pain of sexual awakening; it will outlast its period and provincial setting."

In The Test of Time – What makes a classic a classic? (Waterstone's, 1999), Adrian Mitchell chose Jampot Smith as one of his classics, referring to Brooks as "a very underestimated writer".

The Irish Times wrote, 'Jampot Smith is exact, funny, sad and beautiful; it is, I think, a masterpiece.'

Smith, As Hero

Brooks's follow-up to Jampot Smith, Smith, As Hero, received glowing reviews in the national press in the UK and literary stardom seemed assured. As luck would have it, the novel then suffered a fatal blow when it was launched in the United States during a newspaper strike. The resulting lack of publicity has contributed to the book's near-invisibility, despite its being his most mature and accessible work.

One reviewer, Isabel Quigley in The Sunday Telegraph, wrote: "The crashing of serio-comic novelists between two stools is a familiar sound to novel reviewers, since few funny novels with serious intentions manage to be either funny or serious enough. Many try to pull it off, for it looks so easy (think of the disarming simplicity of a book as deadly, deadpan and complex as 'A Handful of Dust' say). But few succeed. Among the few I would put Jeremy Brooks with his 'Smith, As Hero', sequel to the much-praised 'Jampot Smith'. It seems to me, though in a totally different style, quite as funny as the early Waugh, and with a flavour indescribably mixed, strong, attractive and alarming... ...It is part of Brooks’s extraordinary skill at mixing his levels of feeling, intensity and response that he can end this wildly comic novel with an appalling scene aboard a post-war immigrants' hell-ship to Palestine, and make it seem a part of all that has gone before. Smith has, by then, grown up a little."

The above is typical of the reviews he received at publication in the UK, yet perhaps Brooks himself contributed to burying this book. He had never been a good salesman of his most personal work (the novels and poems) and, in speaking of Smith, As Hero, he often lamented what he saw as a formal error in the book; this was a foray into metafiction with the introduction in a late chapter of a character called Jeremy Brooks (a device used two decades later by Martin Amis in Money). This experiment was partly driven by his desire to distance himself from the protagonist Bernard Smith, but soon after publication he came to think of it as a mistake – a hole in what was otherwise a watertight ship. But it was too late. Great reviews did nothing to mollify him – on the contrary, they disturbed him. Typically, he was being too hard on himself (and perhaps also on those reviewers who had failed to upbraid him for his perceived mistake). It may be that to some extent Brooks subsequently 'lost his voice', or his muse, as a novelist and, apart from the four novellas collected in Doing the Voices (1986), never published a major work of fiction again.

There may have been another reason for his never having completed another novel: the period generally known as 'the sixties' had altered the world to such an extent that his voice, forged in wartime Britain, suddenly seemed outdated. The American beat was in the ascendant; literature had to be hip, had to address the new consciousness and speak to it in its own tones. Writers like Ken Kesey, Robert Stone (a close friend of Brooks), Joseph Heller, Kurt Vonnegutt, spoke the language that people wanted to hear. Many British writers (contemporaries like Kingsley Amis, for example) simply carried on regardless in the old tones, but Brooks perhaps felt the change too deeply. With teenage children and many American friends, the 'new' was all around him and yet he could find no place for it in his fiction; no place for Bernard Smith in this brave new world.

Novels

The Water Carnival, 1957
Jampot Smith, 1960
Henry’s War, 1962
Smith, As Hero, 1964
Doing the Voices (collection of short novellas), 1986
 (for children) The Magic Perambulator, 1965

Poetry

Wales, 1950, 2008

Screenplays

Our Mother's House, 1967
Work is a Four Letter Word, 1968

Television

Days in the Trees, from a stage play by Marguerite Duras
Enemies, from a stage play by Maxim Gorky, for American Public Service TV
An Artist's Story, from a short story by Anton Chekhov, directed by David Jones
On the High Road, from a short story by Chekhov, dir. Karel Reisz
A Misfortune, from a short story by Chekhov, dir. Ken Loach[
The Grand Inquisitor, from Dostoevsky's The Brothers Karamazov
Death Happens to Other People, an original television play

Stage adaptations

Nikolai Gogol's The Government Inspector, for the RSC, directed by Peter Hall, starring Paul Scofield.
Maxim Gorky (all from literal translations by Kitty Hunter-Blair): Enemies, for the RSC, dir. David Jones; The Lower Depths, for the RSC, dir. David Jones; Summerfolk, for the RSC, dir. David Jones; The Zykov’s, for the RSC, dir. David Jones; Children of the Sun, for the RSC, dir. Terry Hands; Barbarians, for BAM Theatre, Brooklyn, dir. David Jones
Anton Chekhov's Ivanov (with Kitty Hunter-Blair), for the RSC, dir. David Jones.
Ibsen's Rosmersholm, for the Haymarlet Theatre, dir. Clifford Williams.
Strindberg's Comrades, for the RSC at The Place, dir. Barry Kyle.
Alexander Solzhenitsyn's The Love Girl and the Innocent (with Kitty Hunter-Blair), for the RSC.
Alexander Ostrovsky's The Forest (with K H-B), for the RSC at The Other Place, dir. Adrian Noble. Transferred to the Warehouse Theatre, then to the Aldwych.
Dylan Thomas's A Child's Christmas in Wales (with Adrian Mitchell), dramatised version of the poem, directed by Clifford Williams.
Kenneth Graham's The Wind in the Willows, for Theatre Clwyd, Mold, dir. Christopher Sandford.

Radio

Smith, As Killer, original radio play.
Just Like Home, original radio play.
A Light Shines in the Darkness, from an unfinished stage play by Leo Tolstoy

External links
 Jampot Smith
 My Guide as a Dramaturg 
 Obituaries, etc.
 Obituary 
 Poetry

1926 births
1994 deaths
People from Llandudno
Writers from Southampton
20th-century English dramatists and playwrights
20th-century English novelists
20th-century English poets
British male dramatists and playwrights
British male poets
English male novelists
English male screenwriters
20th-century English male writers
20th-century English screenwriters